Langhei Township is a township in Pope County, Minnesota,  United States. Langhei is a name derived from Norwegian meaning "long highland".  The population was 217 at the 2000 census.

Geography

Demographics
As of the census of 2000, there were 217 people, 78 households, and 63 families residing in the township.  The population density was 6.1 people per square mile (2.4/km2).  There were 99 housing units at an average density of 2.8/sq mi (1.1/km2).  The racial makeup of the township was 100.00% White.

There were 78 households, out of which 32.1% had children under the age of 18 living with them, 74.4% were married couples living together, 1.3% had a female householder with no husband present, and 19.2% were non-families. 17.9% of all households were made up of individuals, and 6.4% had someone living alone who was 65 years of age or older.  The average household size was 2.78 and the average family size was 3.17.

In the township the population was spread out, with 30.4% under the age of 18, 5.5% from 18 to 24, 22.6% from 25 to 44, 23.0% from 45 to 64, and 18.4% who were 65 years of age or older.  The median age was 40 years. For every 100 females, there were 119.2 males.  For every 100 females age 18 and over, there were 125.4 males.

The median income for a household in the township was $43,929, and the median income for a family was $49,063. Males had a median income of $38,542 versus $16,250 for females. The per capita income for the township was $16,829.  None of the population or families were below the poverty line.

References

Townships in Pope County, Minnesota
Townships in Minnesota